Hardiman Peak is a peak,  high, forming the eastern extremity of the ridge along the north side of Zotikov Glacier, in the Prince Olav Mountains of Antarctica. It was named by the Advisory Committee on Antarctic Names for Terrance L. Hardiman, a United States Antarctic Research Program geomagnetist/seismologist at South Pole Station, 1965.

References

Mountains of the Ross Dependency
Dufek Coast